Asia's Got Talent is a televised Asian talent show competition, and part of the global Got Talent franchise created by Simon Cowell. Produced and aired by AXN Asia, it was created in the wake of the successes of both America's Got Talent and Britain's Got Talent, and premiered on March 12, 2015, across 15 countries in Asia. For each season, a contestants of any age can audition for the televised contest with whatever talent they wish to demonstrate, with the winner receiving a prize of $100,000.

Participants face a series of rounds, in which they perform before a panel of judges who have a part in how much they progress, alongside viewers - the current judging panel consists of Anggun, David Foster, and Jay Park. The program is currently presented by actors Alan Wong and Justin Bratton. It is currently the only program in the Got Talent franchise to broadcast multiple languages; translators are provided for some participants if they cannot speak English and the judges are not fluent in their native tongue.

History

After being acquired by AXN Asia, work began on producing an Asian version of the Got Talent franchise during late 2014 and early 2015. Officially announced on 15 January 2015, the judges for the first season consisted of Anggun, David Foster, Melanie C, and Vanness Wu. Over a week later, on 24 January, Marc Nelson and Rovilson Fernandez were announced as the hosts of the show. The program proved popular with viewers, but received no second season until two years later. By then, the format was changed slightly. Foster and Anggun decided to stay on while  Melanie C and Vanness opted to drop out, leading to Jay Park being recruited as a new judge and the panel lacking a fourth judge. In addition, Nelson and Fernandez did not return, leading to Alan Wong and Justin Bratton being contracted to appear as the new hosts. By the beginning of the second season, interest for entry as a participant led to acts coming from around 28 countries to appear on the program, up from 15 countries in the first season.

Judges and Hosts

Season summary

Season 1 (2015)

In 2014, AXN Asia acquired the franchise to create Asia's Got Talent. Open auditions were held in various cities in later that year.

On January 13, 2015, the judging panel was revealed, consisting of David Foster, Anggun, Vanness Wu of F4, and Melanie C of the Spice Girls. Marc Nelson and Rovilson Fernandez were announced as the hosts.

The judges' audition were recorded at the Pinewood Iskandar Malaysia Studios. The semifinals and finals were held at the Marina Bay Sands at Singapore. The live shows were taped a few hours before the schedule airing of the show to put subtitles as not all contestants speak fluently in English. The inaugural season started airing on March 12, 2015. El Gamma Penumbra, a shadow play group, was hailed as the first winner of the show. Khusugtun, Gerphil Flores, and The Talento ended up at second, third, and fourth places, respectively.

Due to the delayed airing of the final results show, a photo was posted on Instagram where El Gamma Penumbra is on the stage with the golden buzzer background and confetti; captioned the group as the winners. This caused a dismay among the netizens due to its spoiler nature.

Season 2 (2017)

In third week of May 2015, Asia's Got Talent announced the pre-registration for Season 2 on its official Facebook page. The launch of the second season was finally announced in the second week of January 2017 after the success of the fifth season of The Amazing Race Asia.

On July 28, 2017, Jay Park was announced as the new judge, joining David Foster and Anggun who both returned from the first season. Alan Wong and Justin Bratton were also introduced as the new hosts of the show.

The judges' audition were taped starting July 28, 2017 at the Pinewood Iskandar Malaysia Studios. Unlike the previous season, the semifinals were taped from the last week of September until the first week of October at the same studio. The second season started airing on October 12, 2017. The season was won by the spooky magician The Sacred Riana, with dance group DM-X Comvaleñoz, beatboxer Neil Rey Garcia Llanes, and digital dancer Canion Shijirbat finishing at second, third, and fourth places, respectively.

Season 3 (2019)

On May 14, 2018, AXN Asia announced the third season of the show, followed by the opening of the online auditions two days later. Open auditions were held in major cities, including Bangkok, Singapore, Manila, Ho Chi Minh, Jakarta, and Kuala Lumpur. On July 9, 2018, it was announced that the online auditions were extended for another week until July 16, 2018.

On September 16, 2018, it was announced that all judges and hosts from the previous season will return this year.

The judges' audition were taped from September 19 to 27, 2018 at the Pinewood Iskandar Malaysia Studios, like the previous seasons. The semifinals were taped on December 6, 10, and 13, 2018 at the same studio. It started airing on February 7, 2019. The season was won by magician Eric Chien, with human calculator Yaashwin Sarawanan, contemporary acrobatic dancers Power Duo, and hip-hop dance group Maniac Family finishing at second, third, and fourth places, respectively.

Broadcast
Aside from being broadcast via AXN Asia, FremantleAsia also secured deals for the program to be aired across various free-to-air channels in Thailand, Vietnam, Indonesia and India, after its original airing. The following lists where broadcast of Asia's Got Talent is allowed:

Note

Awards and nominations
2015 Asian Television Awards
 Won: Best Adaptation of an Existing Format
 Highly Commended: Best General Entertainment Programme
 Nominated: Best Reality Show

References

External links
 Asia's Got Talent official website
 Asia's Got Talent official web page on the AXN Asia website

2010s Singaporean television series
2015 Singaporean television series debuts
Got Talent
Non-British television series based on British television series